Emil-Edwin Reinert, or Emile-Edwin Reinert, (16 March 1903 – 17 October 1953) was a French film director, screenwriter, audio engineer and producer.

Born in Rava-Ruska, Austria-Hungary in 1903, Reinert directed films in France, Great Britain, Switzerland and Austria as well he directed in co productions, associating different countries : Austria, France, Italy, West Germany, Great Britain and the United States. He died in Paris in 1953.

Filmography

As director

Short films
1932 La machine à sous
1932 La Seine
1932 Les porcelaines de Limoges
1933 La tête de veau
1933 On déjeune à midi
1934 Une affaire garantie
1935 Nous serons toujours heureux
1935 Le siège arrière

Feature films
 
1930 Caïn, aventures des mers exotiques (as assistant director)
1936 Treachery on the High Seas
1939 The Blue Danube, Amore ribelle
1941 Der doppelte Matthias und seine Töchter,Das Fünfmäderlhaus
1946 Dropped from Heaven
1947 Naughty Martine
1947 Destiny Has Fun
1947 The Sharks of Gibraltar
1949 Thus Finishes the Night
1949 Fandango
1950 Quay of Grenelle  The Strollers, Vipere, Dein Weg is dir bestimmt, Danger is a woman, Министерство труда
1950 Bed for Two; Rendezvous with Luck
1951 A Tale of Five Cities
1951 The Red Needle
1951 Dreaming Days
1951 Vienna Waltzes
1951 Maria Theresa
1952 Adventure in Vienna

As screen writer 
1939 Le Danube bleu
1950 Rendez-vous avec la chance
1950 Les mémoires de la vache Yolande,
1951 The Red Needle
1951 Dreaming Days
1951 Vienna Waltzes

As producer and supervisor 
1936 Gypsy Melody

Actors and actresses

He directed among others the following actors and actresses:

 In Great Britain :  Eva Bartok, Bebe Daniels, Bonar Colleano, Charles Farrell, Tom Helmore, Barbara Kelly, Gina Lollobrigida, Lana Morris and Lupe Vélez.
 In Austria : Rosa Albach-Retty, Axel von Ambesser, Cornell Borchers, Otto Wilhelm Fischer, Gustav Fröhlich, Attila Hörbiger, Hans Gustl Kernmayr, Franz Lederer, Marianne Schönauer, Anton Walbrook and Paula Wessely.
 In France : Michel Auclair, Raymond Bussières, André Claveau, Jean-Roger Caussimon, Claude Dauphin, Danièle Delorme, Arthur Devère, Dora Doll, Marcel Duhamel, Pierre Etchepare, Suzanne Flon, Louis de Funès, Margo Lion, Luis Mariano, Marcello Mastroianni, Georges Pitoëff, Dany Robin, Noël Roquevert, Louis Salou, Anne Vernon, Henri Vidal and Jean Vilar.

References

Alternate names 
Emil E. Reinert, Emile E. Reinert, Émile E Reinert, E. E. Reinert, E.E. Reinert

Further reading
(in German) * Dr. Armin Loacker Austrian Noir, Essays zur österreichisch-amerikanischen Koproduktion ABENTEUER IN WIEN / STOLEN IDENTITY; Vienna: Filmarchiv Austria Press, 2005;

External links

 
 Emil Edwin Reinert – BIFI, UK
 Emil-Edwin Reinert – FILMPORTAL.DE
 BIfi – Bibliothèque du film, Paris > Emile-Edwin Reinert

French film directors
French film producers
French male screenwriters
20th-century French screenwriters
English-language film directors
French-language film directors
German-language film directors
1903 births
1953 deaths
20th-century French male writers